Protousnea is a genus of lichenised ascomycetes in the large family Parmeliaceae. It contains two accepted species. Protousnea species have a fruticose growth form, similar to beard lichens (genus Usnea). The genus is endemic to southern South America. The genus was circumscribed in 1976 by Hildur Krog as a segregate genus from Usnea.

Species
Protousnea fibrillatae 
Protousnea magellanica

References

Parmeliaceae
Lichen genera
Lecanorales genera
Taxa described in 1936